The enzyme] phosphatidylserine decarboxylase catalyzes the chemical reaction

phosphatidyl-L-serine  phosphatidylethanolamine + CO2

This enzyme belongs to the family of lyases, specifically the carboxy-lyases, which cleave carbon-carbon bonds.  The systematic name of this enzyme class is phosphatidyl-L-serine carboxy-lyase (phosphatidylethanolamine-forming). Other names in common use include PS decarboxylase, and phosphatidyl-L-serine carboxy-lyase. This enzyme participates in glycine, serine and threonine metabolism, and glycerophospholipid metabolism.  It has two cofactors: pyridoxal phosphate,  and Pyruvate.

References

 
 

EC 4.1.1
Pyridoxal phosphate enzymes
Pyruvate enzymes
Enzymes of unknown structure